Overcast or overcast weather, as defined by the World Meteorological Organization, is the meteorological condition of clouds obscuring at least 95% of the sky. However, the total cloud cover must not be entirely due to obscuring phenomena near the surface, such as fog.

Overcast, written as "OVC" in the METAR observation, is reported when the cloud cover is observed to equal eight oktas (eighths). An overcast sky may be explicitly identified as thin (mostly transparent), but otherwise is considered opaque, which always constitutes a ceiling in aviation meteorology.

Sometimes clouds can be different colors such as black or white, but overcast usually refers to darker skies. In some cases, it can be impossible to see distinct borders of clouds or the sky may be covered by a single type of cloud, such as stratus, and the whole sky will be a dull white.

Periods of overcast weather can range from a few hours to several days. Overcast weather can also affect people suffering from seasonal affective disorder. 

The same weather when observed from above may be referred to as undercast, generally by pilots reporting in-flight weather conditions.

See also

Diffuse reflection
Forward scatter
Light scattering by particles
Diffuser (optics)
Gloom
June Gloom
Hard and soft light
Photon diffusion

References

Clouds

fr:État du ciel